Lauada is an unincorporated community in Swain County, North Carolina, United States. The SCC Swain Center, a satellite location of Southwestern Community College, is located here.

History
Lauada Cemetery, located here, was created in 1943 during the construction of Fontana Lake to move grave sites from multiple cemeteries that now lie under the lake.  More than 1000 graves were moved to the cemetery upon its creation.

References

Unincorporated communities in Swain County, North Carolina
Unincorporated communities in North Carolina